Malnesfjorden or Malnesfjord is a fjord in Bø Municipality in Nordland county, Norway. The inlet to the fjord lies between the village of Hovden to the northwest and the Godvika inlet to the northeast. The mountain Malnesberget lies on the western shore of the fjord.

References

Bø, Nordland
Vesterålen
Fjords of Nordland